 

The Aerosport Scamp A is a small biplane designed for home building by Harris Woods.  It featured an open cabin, tricycle undercarriage, and a T-tail.

The Scamp A first flew on August 21 1973, powered by an 1853 cc Volkswagen car engine.   1,050 sets of plans had sold by 1993. In addition to the many examples which have been completed in the United States, several examples of the type are active in the United Kingdom.

The Agrocopteros Scamp B is an agricultural crop spraying version of the Scamp, modified from kits assembled in Colombia.

Specifications (Scamp A)

See also

References

External links

 

Scamp
1970s United States civil utility aircraft
Single-engined tractor aircraft
Homebuilt aircraft
Biplanes
Aircraft first flown in 1973